Novak Djokovic defeated Stefanos Tsitsipas in the final, 6–3, 7–6(7–4), 7–6(7–5) to win the men's singles tennis title at the 2023 Australian Open. It was his record-extending tenth Australian Open title and 22nd major title overall, tying Rafael Nadal's all-time record total of men's singles titles. He also became the second man to win ten titles at a single major, after Nadal at the French Open. It was his 93rd ATP Tour-level singles title, surpassing Nadal's tally for the fourth-most such titles. Djokovic lost just one set en route to the title (in the second round to Enzo Couacaud), and extended his match winning-streak at the Australian Open to an Open Era record 28 matches (he did not participate the previous year due to being deported from the country for being unvaccinated for COVID-19).

Nadal was the defending champion, but lost in the second round to Mackenzie McDonald.

Carlos Alcaraz, Casper Ruud, Tsitsipas and Djokovic were in contention for the ATP world No. 1 ranking at the beginning of the tournament. By winning the tournament, Djokovic claimed the top spot. Alcaraz, the incumbent world No. 1, withdrew from the tournament due to a right leg injury.

As in the previous major held a few months earlier, neither of the top two seeds advanced to the quarterfinals, with Nadal and Ruud both losing in the second round; this marked the first men's singles major since the 2002 Australian Open where the top two seeds lost prior to the third round. Tsitsipas became the youngest finalist since Djokovic in 2011. Tommy Paul became the first American man to reach the semifinals since Andy Roddick in 2009.

With his win over Thanasi Kokkinakis in the longest match of his career, Andy Murray won a match from two sets down for a record eleventh time.

Seeds

Draw

Finals

Top half

Section 1

Section 2

Section 3

Section 4

Bottom half

Section 5

Section 6

Section 7

Section 8

Seeded players 
The following are the seeded players. Seedings are based on ATP rankings as of 9 January 2023. Rankings and points before are as of 16 January 2023.

† The player did not qualify for the main draw in 2022. He is defending points from two 2022 ATP Challenger Tour tournaments (Concepción and Santa Cruz) instead.

Withdrawn players
The following players would have been seeded, but withdrew before the tournament began.

Other entry information

Wild cards

Source:

Protected ranking

Source:

Qualifiers

Lucky losers

Source:

Withdrawals
The entry list was released by Tennis Australia based on the ATP rankings for the week of 5 December 2022.

See also 
2023 Australian Open – Day-by-day summaries
2023 ATP Tour
2023 ITF Men's World Tennis Tour
List of Grand Slam men's singles champions
International Tennis Federation

Notes

References

External links 
 Draw
 Association of Tennis Professionals (ATP) – 2023 Australian Open Men's Singles draw
 2023 Australian Open – Men's draws and results at the International Tennis Federation

Men's Singles
Australian Open - Men's Singles
2023